Anna-Lisa Augustsson (29 December 1924 – 22 September 2012) was a Swedish sprinter. In 1952 she won the national 100 m and 200 m titles, and became the first Swedish woman to run 100 m in 12 seconds at an official competition. The same year she competed at the 1952 Summer Olympics, but failed to reach the finals of the 100 m and 4 × 100 m relay events.

References

1924 births
2012 deaths
Swedish female sprinters
Olympic athletes of Sweden
Athletes (track and field) at the 1952 Summer Olympics
Olympic female sprinters